Pac-12 Conference tournament may refer to:

Pac-12 Conference men's basketball tournament
Pac-12 Conference women's basketball tournament
Pac-12 Conference baseball tournament
Pac-12 Conference softball tournament